Agonopterix vietnamella is a moth in the family Depressariidae. It was described by Alexandr L. Lvovsky in 2013. It is found in Vietnam.

References

Moths described in 2013
Agonopterix
Moths of Asia